1901 was the 12th season of County Championship cricket in England. Yorkshire defended their title but, unlike the previous year when they were unbeaten, they lost one game during the season to 12th-placed Somerset.

Middlesex finished second, winning six of their eight finished games, but had the highest percentage of draws of anyone save Essex. Once again, Ranjitsinhji scored more than 2,000 runs for Sussex and, with 2,000 runs from C. B. Fry as well, the team finished fourth in the table behind third-placed Lancashire, whose England Test batsman Johnny Tyldesley scored 2,605 runs.

Honours
County Championship – Yorkshire
Minor Counties Championship – Durham
Wisden – Len Braund, Charlie McGahey, Frank Mitchell, Willie Quaife, Johnny Tyldesley

South African tour

South Africa made its second tour of England in 1901, following the inaugural tour in 1894.  This time, the team played first-class cricket, mainly against county opposition, but no Test matches.

South Africa played 15 first-class games with 5 wins, 9 defeats and 1 tied match.  Their overall record was 25 matches, 13 wins, 9 defeats, 2 draws and 1 tied match.

County Championship

Final table 
The final County Championship table is shown below. One point was awarded for a win, none for a draw, and minus one for a loss. Positions were decided on percentage of points over completed games.

 1 Games completed

Points system:

 1 for a win
 0 for a draw, a tie or an abandoned match
 -1 for a loss

Most runs in the County Championship

Most wickets in the County Championship

Overall first-class statistics

Leading batsmen

Leading bowlers

References

Annual reviews
 Wisden Cricketers' Almanack 1902

Further reading
 H S Altham, A History of Cricket, Volume 1 (to 1914), George Allen & Unwin, 1962
 Roy Webber, The Playfair Book of Cricket Records, Playfair Books, 1951

External links
 CricketArchive – England in 1901

1901 in English cricket
1901